Timo Röttger (born 12 July 1985) is a German footballer.

Career
On 9 May 2014, he signed a two-year contract with Viktoria Köln of fourth tier Regionalliga West.

Honours
Promotion to 2. Bundesliga:
 2010–11 (3rd) with Dynamo Dresden
 2013–14 (2nd) with RB Leipzig

References

External links

 
 

1985 births
Living people
German footballers
Germany youth international footballers
Bayer 04 Leverkusen II players
SC Paderborn 07 players
Dynamo Dresden players
RB Leipzig players
FC Viktoria Köln players
SG Sonnenhof Großaspach players
2. Bundesliga players
3. Liga players
Association football wingers